Giovannuccio Pasquali (died 1471) was a Roman Catholic prelate who served as Bishop of Nusco (1446–1471).

Biography
Giovannuccio Pasquali was ordained a priest in the Order of Friars Minor.
In 1446, he was appointed by Pope Eugene IV as Bishop of Nusco. He served as Bishop of Nusco until his death in 1474.

References

External links and additional sources
 (for Chronology of Bishops) 
 (for Chronology of Bishops) 

15th-century Italian Roman Catholic bishops
1474 deaths
Bishops appointed by Pope Eugene IV
Franciscan bishops